Johnathan Lee Williams  III (born May 22, 1995) is an American professional basketball player for Toyotsu Fighting Eagles Nagoya of the Japanese B.League. He played college basketball for the Gonzaga Bulldogs. He spent two seasons with the University of Missouri Tigers men's basketball team before deciding to transfer before the 2015–16 season.

High school career
Williams attended Southwind High School in Memphis, Tennessee for four years, finishing his high school tenure with an 88-17 record and earning a starting spot on the basketball team from the get-go in his freshman year. As a freshman, he averaged 10.2 points and 9.5 rebounds, leading his squad to a 26-5 record and second-place at state, and was named an honorable mention freshman All-American by Max Preps. During his sophomore year, Williams averaged 17.3 points, 11.5 rebounds, 2.1 assists, and 3 blocks, while 52 percent from the field, 48 percent from 3-point, and 80 percent from the free-throw line, as well as a 26-6 record and third-place at the state tournament. As a junior, he averaged 15.7 points, 10.2 rebounds, 2.6 assists, 2.6 blocks, and 1.1 assists, while guiding his team to a 28-5 record and an appearance in the state quarterfinals. Williams capped off his incredible high school career by averaging 18.9 points and 9.5 rebounds, while leading Southwind to a 34-6 record and a state title. He earned  all-state honors by the Tennessee Sports Writers Association in 2011, 2012, and 2013.

Recruiting

After taking official visits to Georgetown, Missouri, Tennessee, Michigan State, and George Mason, Johnathan Williams commit to Missouri. Williams signed with Missouri during the early signing period in November 2012.

College career

Freshman season
As a freshman at Missouri, Johnathan Williams helped to lead to Tigers to an appearance in the NIT and a 23-13 record, and started every game, while averaging 5.8 points, along with team highs of 6.5 rebounds and 1.6 blocks per game. His 227 total rebounds were 11th best in the SEC in 2013–14 and the 4th-most as a freshman at Missouri. His 57 total blocks were 5th-best in the SEC, along with the 8th-best nationally among freshmen, 2nd most by a freshman at Missouri and 5th-most as a Tiger regardless of class.

In his first collegiate game in an 89-53 win over Southeastern Louisiana on November 8, 2013, Williams posted 7 points, 6 rebounds, and 1 assist on 2-for-2 field goals and 3-of-4 free throws. On November 23, Williams grabbed career-highs of 17 rebounds and 2 steals to go along with 7 points, 3 blocks, and 2 assists on 3-for-10 field goals and 1-of-4 free throws in a win over Gardner-Webb. He had a season-high 14 points, along with 8 rebounds, 1 assist, and 1 steal on 3-for-3 from the field and 8-for-10 from the charity stripe in a win against Northwestern on November 28. On December 7 in an 80-71 win over #18 UCLA, he had 10 points, 15 rebounds, 2 blocks, 1 steal, and 1 assist on 3-of-5 field goals and 4-of-6 free throws. On March 5, 2014, Williams blocked a career-high 5 shots, along with 7 points and 8 rebounds on 3-of-7 field goals and 1-of-2 free throws, in a win over Texas A&M. In a double-overtime win over Texas A&M in the SEC Tournament on March 13, Williams dished out a career-high 4 assists to go along with a double-double (11 points and 15 rebounds), 2 blocks, and 1 steal on 3-of-7 2-pointers, 1-for-2 from 3-point land, and 2-of-2 free throw shooting.

Sophomore season
Heading into his sophomore year, Williams was expected to shoulder a much larger role for Missouri with the losses of guards Jabari Brown, Jordan Clarkson, and Earnest Ross, who combined to average more than 50 points per game, as well as head coach Frank Haith. Williams was Missouri's top returning scorer, rebounder, and shot-blocker. However, tough times were ahead for Williams as he suffered a partial meniscus tear in his right knee during the preseason of early October 2014.

Despite leading Missouri in scoring (11.9 points), rebounding (7.1 rebounds), and shot-blocking (0.6) per game during his sophomore season, Williams was hampered all season by a torn meniscus, and the Tigers finished with the most losses and longest losing streak (13) in school history with a 9-23 record.

In the regular season opener in a 69-61 loss to UMKC on November 14, 2014, Williams had a season high of 4 blocks, along with 6 points and 5 rebounds on 3-of-7 field goals. On December 2, he dropped 18 points, 11 rebounds, 1 assist, and 1 block on 5-for-9 field goals and 8-for-14 free throws in a win over Southeast Missouri State. In an overtime loss to Oklahoma State on December 30, Williams scored 22 points, along with 9 rebounds, 1 assist, and 1 steal on 6-of-10 2-point field goals, 2-of-3 3-pointers, and 4-of-7 free throws. On January 8, 2015, he had double-double (21 points and 10 rebounds) and 1 block on 8-for-17 field goal shooting and 5-for-8 free throws in a 74-67 win in overtime over LSU in the SEC opener. Williams had career-highs of 27 points and 3-of-5 from beyond the 3-point arc, along with 7 rebounds, 2 assists, and 1 block, on 6-for-10 2-pointers and 6-for-8 from the free throw line in a 77-74 loss against Mississippi State on February 14. He scored 23 of his points in the second half, including a 3-pointer which brought Mizzou within 1 with 2 seconds remaining, but it wasn't enough.

Junior season

After his 2014–15 campaign with Missouri, Williams decided to transfer. His father cited that Williams didn't fit in with his teammates and didn't believe he was developing enough. His father thought the a redshirt year to "get stronger, work on ball skills and get that knee a chance to heal." Missouri restricted Williams from transferring to 25 schools, including every SEC and Big-12 school, along with Arizona and Illinois. Williams took official visits to Gonzaga, Georgetown, and SMU, but made the decision to transfer to Gonzaga. Williams would have to redshirt the 2015–16 season before having two years of eligibility to play at the beginning of the 2016–17 season.

Senior season
As a senior at Gonzaga, Williams led the team in scoring (13.4 points per game) and rebounding (8.5 per game). He was an All-West Coast Conference selection and was AP All-America honorable mention.

Professional career

Los Angeles Lakers (2018–2019)
After going undrafted in the 2018 NBA Draft, Williams signed a contract offer from the Los Angeles Lakers to be on their Summer League team roster. On July 21, 2018, Williams signed with the Lakers. He was waived on October 13, 2018. Williams then signed a two-way contract with the Lakers on October 19, 2018. On March 9, 2019, Williams scored his career-high 18 points with ten rebounds, an assist and a block in a 120-107 loss to the Boston Celtics. Williams averaged 6.5 points and 4.1 rebounds per game for the Lakers and 15.2 points and 8.7 rebounds per game in the G League.

On June 30, 2019, Williams joined the Houston Rockets for the 2019 NBA Summer League. He averaged 8.4 points and 6.0 rebounds per game in five games.

Maccabi Rishon LeZion (2019)
On July 30, 2019, Williams signed with Maccabi Rishon LeZion of the Israel Premier League. On November 13, 2019, Williams recorded a double-double of 11 rebounds and a career-high 19 points, while shooting 7-of-11 from the field, in a 79–85 loss to Virtus Bologna. In 18 games played for Rishon LeZion, he averaged 11.7 points and 9.1 rebounds per game. On December 23, 2019, he parted ways with Rishon LeZion after receiving offers from NBA teams.

Washington Wizards (2019–2020)
On December 26, 2019, Williams signed with the Washington Wizards. On January 4, 2020, Williams was waived by the Wizards after appearing in 6 games for the team. Eight days later on January 12, 2020, the Washington Wizards announced that they had signed Williams to a two-way contract. In the G League, Williams averaged 13.1 points, 9.6 rebounds, 1.4 assists and 1.1 blocks per game.

Galatasaray (2020–2021)
On September 6, 2020, Williams signed with Galatasaray of the Turkish Basketball Super League (BSL).

Niners Chemnitz (2021)
On February 24, 2021, he signed with Niners Chemnitz of the German Basketball Bundesliga (BBL).

Aquila Basket Trento (2021–2022)
On August 21, 2021, Williams signed with Dolomiti Energia Trento of the Lega Basket Serie A.

National team career
Johnathan Williams helped the USA win a gold medal in the 2011 FIBA Americas U16 Championship, while averaging 5.4 points and 4.6 rebounds. In 2012, Williams joined the US and won a gold medal in the FIBA U17 World Championship, while averaging 7 points and 4.6 rebounds in 16 minutes per game.

Career statistics

NBA

Regular season

|-
| style="text-align:left;"| 
| style="text-align:left;"| L.A. Lakers
| 24 || 0 || 15.5 || .591 || .000 || .563 || 4.1 || .5 || .3 || .3 || 6.5
|-
| style="text-align:left;"| 
| style="text-align:left;"| Washington
| 6 || 5 || 20.5 || .682 || .000 || .600 || 6.3 || 1.0 || .2 || .4 || 5.5
|- class="sortbottom"
| style="text-align:center;" colspan="2"| Career
| 30 || 5 || 16.5 || .606 || .000 || .566 || 4.6 || .6 || .3 || .3 || 6.3

G League

Regular season

|-
| style="text-align:left;"| 2018-19
| style="text-align:left;"| South Bay
| 36 || 31 || 27.3 || .546 || .250 || .433 || 8.7 || 1.7 || .7 || .9 || 15.2
|-
| style="text-align:left;"| 2019-20
| style="text-align:left;"| Capital City
| 16 || 16 || 25.5 || .679 || .000 || .462 || 9.4 || 1.8 || .5 || 1.0 || 13.1
|- class="sortbottom"
| style="text-align:center;" colspan="2"| Career
| 51 || 47 || 26.7 || .575 || .212 || .445 || 9.0 || 1.6 || .7 || .9 || 14.9

College

|-
| style="text-align:left;"| 2013–14
| style="text-align:left;"| Missouri
| 35 || 35 || 26.3 || .457 || .364 || .565 || 6.5 || .7 || .4 || 1.6 || 5.8
|-
| style="text-align:left;"| 2014–15
| style="text-align:left;"| Missouri
| 32 || 32 || 29.4 || .412 || .344 || .617 || 7.1 || .8 || .3 || .6 || 11.9
|-
| style="text-align:left;"| 2016–17
| style="text-align:left;"| Gonzaga
| 39 || 39 || 24.3 || .592 || .400 || .563 || 6.4 || .8 || .7 || .9 || 10.2
|-
| style="text-align:left;"| 2017–18
| style="text-align:left;"| Gonzaga
| 34 || 33 || 29.2 || .565 || .242 || .561 || 8.3 || 1.6 || .7 || 1.2 || 13.5
|-
|- class="sortbottom"
| style="text-align:center;" colspan="2" | Career
| 140 || 139 || 27.3 || .507 || .338 || .577 || 7.1 || 1.0 || .5 || 1.1 || 10.4

Source: RealGM

Personal life
Williams is the son of Johnny Williams and Barbara Williams.

References

External links
 Gonzaga Bulldogs bio
 RealGM profile

1995 births
Living people
21st-century African-American sportspeople
African-American basketball players
American expatriate basketball people in Israel
American expatriate basketball people in Turkey
American men's basketball players
Aquila Basket Trento players
Basketball players from Memphis, Tennessee
Capital City Go-Go players
Galatasaray S.K. (men's basketball) players
Gonzaga Bulldogs men's basketball players
Los Angeles Lakers players
Maccabi Rishon LeZion basketball players
Missouri Tigers men's basketball players
Power forwards (basketball)
South Bay Lakers players
Undrafted National Basketball Association players
Washington Wizards players